Ananthavarappadu is a village located in Guntur district of the Indian state of Andhra Pradesh. It is located in Vatticherukuru mandal of Guntur revenue division. Ananthavarappadu Village is Adopted by Sri Galla Jayadev gaaru, Member of parliament for Guntur (Lok Sabha constituency) under the scheme of Sansad Adarsh Gram Yojana on 2014.

Geography 

References 

Villages in Guntur district